Below is the list of populated places in Çanakkale Province, Turkey by district. In the following lists first place in each list is the administrative center of the district.

Çanakkale
	Çanakkale
	Akçalı, Çanakkale
	Akçapınar, Çanakkale
	Akçeşme, Çanakkale
	Alanköy, Çanakkale
	Aşağıokçular, Çanakkale
	Belen, Çanakkale
	Bodurlar, Çanakkale
	Civler, Çanakkale
	Çamyayla, Çanakkale
	Çınarlı, Çanakkale
	Çıplak, Çanakkale
	Çiftlikdere, Çanakkale
	Dedeler, Çanakkale
	Denizgöründü, Çanakkale
	Dümrek, Çanakkale
	Elmacık, Çanakkale
	Erenköy, Çanakkale
	Gökçalı, Çanakkale
	Güzelyalı, Çanakkale
	Halileli, Çanakkale
	Haliloğlu, Çanakkale
	Işıklar, Çanakkale
	Kalabaklı, Çanakkale
	Kalafat, Çanakkale
	Karacalar, Çanakkale
	Karacaören, Çanakkale
	Karapınar, Çanakkale
	Kayadere, Çanakkale
	Kemalköy, Çanakkale
	Kepez, Çanakkale
	Kızılcaören, Çanakkale
	Kızılkeçili, Çanakkale
	Kirazlı, Çanakkale
	Kocalar, Çanakkale
	Kumkale, Çanakkale
	Kurşunlu, Çanakkale
	Maraşalfevziçakmak, Çanakkale
	Musaköy, Çanakkale
	Ortaca, Çanakkale
	Ovacık, Çanakkale
	Özbek, Çanakkale
	Salihler, Çanakkale
	Saraycık, Çanakkale
	Sarıbeyli, Çanakkale
	Sarıcaeli, Çanakkale
	Serçiler, Çanakkale
	Taşlıtarla, Çanakkale
	Terziler, Çanakkale
	Tevfikiye, Çanakkale
	Ulupınar, Çanakkale
	Yağcılar, Çanakkale
	Yapıldak, Çanakkale
	Yukarıokçular, Çanakkale

Ayvacık
	Ayvacık
	Adatepe, Ayvacık
	Ahmetçe, Ayvacık
	Ahmetler, Ayvacık
	Akçin, Ayvacık
	Arıklı, Ayvacık
	Babadere, Ayvacık
	Babakale, Ayvacık
	Bademli, Ayvacık
	Baharlar, Ayvacık
	Bahçedere, Ayvacık
	Balabanlı, Ayvacık
	Behram, Ayvacık
	Bektaş, Ayvacık
	Bilaller, Ayvacık
	Budaklar, Ayvacık
	Büyükhusun, Ayvacık
	Cemaller, Ayvacık
	Çakmaklar, Ayvacık
	Çaltı, Ayvacık
	Çamkalabak, Ayvacık
	Çamköy, Ayvacık
	Çınarpınar, Ayvacık
	Demirci, Ayvacık
	Dibekli, Ayvacık
	Erecek, Ayvacık
	Gülpınar, Ayvacık
	Güzelköy, Ayvacık
	Hüseyinfakı, Ayvacık
	İlyasfakı, Ayvacık
	Kayalar, Ayvacık
	Keçikaya, Ayvacık
	Kestanelik, Ayvacık
	Kırca, Ayvacık
	Kısacık, Ayvacık
	Kocaköy, Ayvacık
	Korubaşı, Ayvacık
	Koyunevi, Ayvacık
	Kozlu, Ayvacık
	Kösedere, Ayvacık
	Kulfal, Ayvacık
	Kuruoba, Ayvacık
	Küçükçetmi, Ayvacık
	Küçükhusun, Ayvacık
	Küçükkuyu, Ayvacık
	Misvak, Ayvacık
	Naldöken, Ayvacık
	Nusratlı, Ayvacık
	Paşaköy, Ayvacık
	Pınardere, Ayvacık
	Sapanca, Ayvacık
	Sazlı, Ayvacık
	Söğütlü, Ayvacık
	Süleymanköy, Ayvacık
	Şapköy, Ayvacık
       Tabaklar, Ayvacık
	Tamış, Ayvacık
	Tartışık, Ayvacık
	Taşağıl, Ayvacık
	Taşboğaz, Ayvacık
	Tuzla, Ayvacık
	Tuztaşı, Ayvacık
	Uzunalan, Ayvacık
	Yeniçam, Ayvacık
	Yeşilyurt, Ayvacık
	Yukarıköy, Ayvacık

Bayramiç
	Bayramiç
	Ağaçköy, Bayramiç
	Ahmetçeli, Bayramiç
	Akpınar, Bayramiç
	Alakeçi, Bayramiç
	Alikabaklar, Bayramiç
	Aşağışapcı, Bayramiç
	Aşağışevik, Bayramiç
	Bekirler, Bayramiç
	Beşik, Bayramiç
	Bezirganlar, Bayramiç
	Bıyıklı, Bayramiç
	Cazgirler, Bayramiç
	Çalıdağı, Bayramiç
	Çalıobaakçakıl, Bayramiç
	Çatalçam, Bayramiç
	Çavuşköy, Bayramiç
	Çavuşlu, Bayramiç
	Çırpılar, Bayramiç
	Çiftlik, Bayramiç
	Dağahmetçe, Bayramiç
	Dağoba, Bayramiç
	Daloba, Bayramiç
	Doğancı, Bayramiç
	Evciler, Bayramiç
	Gedik, Bayramiç
	Gökçeiçi, Bayramiç
	Güvemcik, Bayramiç
	Güzeltepe, Bayramiç
	Hacıbekirler, Bayramiç
	Hacıdervişler, Bayramiç
	Hacıköy, Bayramiç
	Işıkeli, Bayramiç
	Karaibrahimler, Bayramiç
	Karaköy, Bayramiç
	Karıncalık, Bayramiç
	Kaykılar, Bayramiç
	Korucak, Bayramiç
	Koşuburnutürkmenleri
	Köseler, Bayramiç
	Köylü, Bayramiç
	Kurşunlu, Bayramiç
	Kuşçayır, Bayramiç
	Kutluoba, Bayramiç
	Külcüler, Bayramiç
	Mollahasanlar, Bayramiç
	Muratlar, Bayramiç
	Nebiler, Bayramiç
	Osmaniye, Bayramiç
	Örenli, Bayramiç
	Palamutoba, Bayramiç
	Pınarbaşı, Bayramiç
	Pıtıreli, Bayramiç
	Saçaklı, Bayramiç
	Saraycık, Bayramiç
	Sarıdüz, Bayramiç
	Sarıot, Bayramiç
	Serhat, Bayramiç
	Söğütgediği, Bayramiç
	Toluklar, Bayramiç
	Tongurlu, Bayramiç
	Tülüler, Bayramiç
	Türkmenli, Bayramiç
	Üçyol, Bayramiç
	Üzümlü, Bayramiç
	Yahşieli, Bayramiç
	Yanıklar, Bayramiç
	Yassıbağ, Bayramiç
	Yaylacık, Bayramiç
	Yeniceköy, Bayramiç
	Yeniköy, Bayramiç
	Yeşilköy, Bayramiç
	Yiğitaliler, Bayramiç
	Yukarışapçı, Bayramiç
	Yukarışevik, Bayramiç
	Zerdalilik, Bayramiç
	Zeytinli, Bayramiç

Biga
	Biga
	Abdiağa, Biga
	Adliye, Biga
	Ağaköy, Biga
	Ahmetler, Biga
	Akkayrak, Biga
	Akköprü, Biga
	Akpınar, Biga
	Aksaz, Biga
	Akyaprak, Biga
	Ambaroba, Biga
	Arabaalan, Biga
	Arabakonağı, Biga
	Aşağıdemirci, Biga
	Ayıtdere, Biga
	Aziziye, Biga
	Bahçeli, Biga
	Bakacak, Biga
	Bakacaklıçiftliği, Biga
	Balıklıçeşme, Biga
	Bekirli, Biga
	Bezirganlar, Biga
	Bozlar, Biga
	Camialan, Biga
	Cihadiye, Biga
	Çakırlı, Biga
	Çavuşköy, Biga
	Çelikgürü, Biga
	Çeltik, Biga
	Çeşmealtı, Biga
	Çınardere, Biga
	Çınarköprü, Biga
	Çömlekçi, Biga
	Danişment, Biga
	Değirmencik, Biga
	Dereköy, Biga
	Dikmen, Biga
	Doğancı, Biga
	Eğridere, Biga
	Elmalı, Biga
	Emirorman, Biga
	Eskibalıklı, Biga
	Eybekli, Biga
	Gemicikırı, Biga
	Geredelli, Biga
	Gerlengeç, Biga
	Geyikkırı, Biga
	Göktepe, Biga
	Güleç, Biga
	Gümüşçay, Biga
	Gündoğdu, Biga
	Gürçeşme, Biga
	Gürgendere, Biga
	Güvemalan, Biga
	Hacıhüseyinyaylası, Biga
	Hacıköy, Biga
	Hacıpehlivan, Biga
	Harmanlı, Biga
	Havdan, Biga
	Hisarlı, Biga
	Hoşoba, Biga
	Ilıcabaşı, Biga
	Işıkeli, Biga
	İdriskoru, Biga
	İlyasalan, Biga
	İskender, Biga
	Kahvetepe, Biga
	Kalafat, Biga
	Kaldırımbaşı, Biga
	Kanibey, Biga
	Kapanbelen, Biga
	Karaağaç, Biga
	Karabiga, Biga
	Karacaali, Biga
	Karahamzalar, Biga
	Karapürçek, Biga
	Kaşıkçıoba, Biga
	Katrancı, Biga
	Kayapınar, Biga
	Kaynarca, Biga
	Kazmalı, Biga
	Kemer, Biga
	Kepekli, Biga
	Kocagür, Biga
	Koruoba, Biga
	Kozçeşme, Biga
	Osmaniye, Biga
	Otlukdere, Biga
	Ovacık, Biga
	Örtülüce, Biga
	Paşaçayı, Biga
	Pekmezli, Biga
	Ramazanlar, Biga
	Sarıca, Biga
	Sarıkaya, Biga
	Sarısıvat, Biga
	Sarnıç, Biga
	Savaştepe, Biga
	Sazoba, Biga
	Selvi, Biga
	Sığırcık, Biga
	Sinekçi, Biga
	Şakirbey, Biga
	Şirinköy, Biga
	Tokatkırı, Biga
	Türkbakacak, Biga
	Yanıç, Biga
	Yenice, Biga
	Yeniçiftlik, Biga
	Yenimahalle, Biga
	Yeşilköy, Biga
	Yolindi, Biga
	Yukarıdemirci, Biga

Bozcaada
	Bozcaada

Çan

	Çan
	Ahlatlıburun, Çan
	Alibeyçiftliği, Çan
	Altıkulaç, Çan
	Asmalı, Çan
	Bahadırlı, Çan
	Bardakçılar, Çan
	Bilaller, Çan
	Bostandere, Çan
	Bozguç, Çan
	Büyükpaşa, Çan
	Büyüktepe, Çan
	Cicikler, Çan
	Çakılköy, Çan
	Çaltıkara, Çan
	Çamköy, Çan
	Çekiçler, Çan
	Çomaklı, Çan
	Danapınar, Çan
	Derenti, Çan
	Dereoba, Çan
	Doğaca, Çan
	Doğancılar, Çan
	Dondurma, Çan
	Duman, Çan
	Durali, Çan
	Emeşe, Çan
	Eskiyayla, Çan
	Etili, Çan
	Göle, Çan
	Hacıkasım, Çan
	Hacılar, Çan
	Halilağa, Çan
	Helvacı, Çan
	Hurma, Çan
	İlyasağaçiftliği, Çan
	Kadılar, Çan
	Kalburcu, Çan
	Karadağ, Çan
	Karakadılar, Çan
	Karakoca, Çan
	Karlı, Çan
	Kazabat, Çan
	Keçiağılı, Çan
	Kızılelma, Çan
	Kocayayla, Çan
	Koyunyeri, Çan
	Kulfal, Çan
	Kumarlar, Çan
	Küçüklü, Çan
	Küçükpaşa, Çan
	Mallı, Çan
	Maltepe, Çan
	Okçular, Çan
	Ozancık, Çan
	Sameteli, Çan
	Söğütalan, Çan
	Şerbetli, Çan
	Tepeköy, Çan
	Terzialan, Çan
	Uzunalan, Çan
	Üvezdere, Çan
	Yaya, Çan
	Yaykın, Çan
	Yeniçeri, Çan
	Yuvalar, Çan
	Zeybekçayır, Çan

Eceabat
	Eceabat	
	Alçıtepe, Eceabat	
	Behramlı, Eceabat	
	Beşyol, Eceabat	
	Çamyayla, Eceabat	
	Büyükanafarta, Eceabat	
	Kilitbahir, Eceabat	
	Kocadere, Eceabat	
	Kumköy, Eceabat	
	Küçükanafarta, Eceabat	
	Seddülbahir, Eceabat	
	Yalova, Eceabat	
	Yolağzı, Eceabat

Ezine
	Ezine
	Akçakeçili, Ezine
	Akköy, Ezine
	Aladağ, Ezine
	Alemşah, Ezine
	Arasanlı, Ezine
	Bahçeli, Ezine
	Balıklı, Ezine
	Belen, Ezine
	Bozalan, Ezine
	Bozeli, Ezine
	Çamköy, Ezine
	Çamlıca, Ezine
	Çamoba, Ezine
	Çarıksız, Ezine
	Çetmi, Ezine
	Çınarköy, Ezine
	Dalyan, Ezine
	Derbentbaşı, Ezine
	Geyikli, Ezine
	Gökçebayır, Ezine
	Güllüce, Ezine
	Hisaralan, Ezine
	Karadağ, Ezine
	Karagömlek, Ezine
	Kayacık, Ezine
	Kemallı, Ezine
	Kızılköy, Ezine
	Kızıltepe, Ezine
	Koçali, Ezine
	Köprübaşı, Ezine
	Körüktaşı, Ezine
	Köseler, Ezine
	Kumburun, Ezine
	Mahmudiye, Ezine
	Mecidiye, Ezine
	Pazarköy, Ezine
	Pınarbaşı, Ezine
	Sarpdere, Ezine
	Şapköy, Ezine
	Taştepe, Ezine
	Tavaklı, Ezine
	Uluköy, Ezine
	Üsküfçü, Ezine
	Üvecik, Ezine
	Yavaşlar, Ezine
	Yaylacık, Ezine
	Yenioba, Ezine
	Yeniköy, Ezine

Gelibolu
	Gelibolu
	Adilhan, Gelibolu
	Bayırköy, Gelibolu
	Bayramiç, Gelibolu
	Bolayır, Gelibolu
	Burhanlı, Gelibolu
	Cevizli, Gelibolu
	Cumalı, Gelibolu
	Çokal, Gelibolu
	Değirmendüzü, Gelibolu
	Demirtepe, Gelibolu
	Evreşe, Gelibolu
	Fındıklı, Gelibolu
	Güneyli, Gelibolu
	Ilgardere, Gelibolu
	Kalealtı, Gelibolu
	Karainebeyli, Gelibolu
	Kavakköy, Gelibolu
	Kavaklı, Gelibolu
	Kocaçeşme, Gelibolu
	Koruköy, Gelibolu
	Ocaklı, Gelibolu
	Pazarlı, Gelibolu
	Süleymaniye, Gelibolu
	Sütlüce, Gelibolu
	Şadıllı, Gelibolu
	Tayfurköy, Gelibolu
	Yeniköy, Gelibolu
	Yülüce, Gelibolu

Gökçeada
	Gökçeada		
	Bademli, Gökçeada		
	Dereköy, Gökçeada		
	Eşelek, Gökçeada		
	Kaleköy, Gökçeada		
	Şirinköy, Gökçeada		
	Tepeköy, Gökçeada		
	Uğurlu, Gökçeada		
	Yenibademli, Gökçeada		
	Zeytinliköy, Gökçeada

Lapseki
	Lapseki
	Adatepe, Lapseki
	Akçaalan, Lapseki
	Alpagut, Lapseki
	Balcılar, Lapseki
	Beybaş, Lapseki
	Beyçayırı, Lapseki
	Beypınar, Lapseki
	Çamyurt, Lapseki
	Çardak, Lapseki
	Çataltepe, Lapseki
	Çavuşköy, Lapseki
	Dereköy, Lapseki
	Dişbudak, Lapseki
	Doğandere, Lapseki
	Dumanlı, Lapseki
	Eçialan, Lapseki
	Gökköy, Lapseki
	Güreci, Lapseki
	Hacıgelen, Lapseki
	Hacıömerler, Lapseki
	Harmancık, Lapseki
	İlyasköy, Lapseki
	Kangırlı, Lapseki
	Karamusalar, Lapseki
	Karaömerler, Lapseki
	Kemiklialan, Lapseki
	Kırcalar, Lapseki
	Kızıldam, Lapseki
	Kocabaşlar, Lapseki
	Kocaveli, Lapseki
	Mecidiye, Lapseki
	Nusratiye, Lapseki
	Sındal, Lapseki
	Subaşı, Lapseki
	Suluca, Lapseki
	Şahinli, Lapseki
	Şevketiye, Lapseki
	Taştepe, Lapseki
	Umurbey, Lapseki
	Üçpınar, Lapseki
	Yaylalar, Lapseki
	Yeniceköy, Lapseki

Yenice

	Yenice
	Akçakoyun, Yenice
	Akköy, Yenice
	Alancık, Yenice
	Araovacık, Yenice
	Armutçuk, Yenice
	Aşağıçavuş, Yenice
	Aşağıinova, Yenice
	Aşağıkaraaşık, Yenice
	Bağlı, Yenice
	Ballıçay, Yenice
	Başkoz, Yenice
	Bayatlar, Yenice
	Bekten, Yenice
	Boynanlar, Yenice
	Canbaz, Yenice
	Çakır, Yenice
	Çakıroba, Yenice
	Çal, Yenice
	Çamoba, Yenice
	Çınarcık, Yenice
	Çınarköy, Yenice
	Çırpılar, Yenice
	Çiftlik, Yenice
	Çukuroba, Yenice
	Darıalan, Yenice
	Davutköy, Yenice
	Gümüşler, Yenice
	Gündoğdu, Yenice
	Güzeloba, Yenice
	Hacılar, Yenice
	Hacıyusuflar, Yenice
	Hamdibey, Yenice
	Haydaroba, Yenice
	Hıdırlar, Yenice
	Kabalı, Yenice
	Kalabakbaşı, Yenice
	Kalkım, Yenice
	Karaaydın, Yenice
	Karadoru, Yenice
	Karaköy, Yenice
	Karasu, Yenice
	Kargacı, Yenice
	Kayatepe, Yenice
	Kıraçoba, Yenice
	Kırıklar, Yenice
	Kızıldam, Yenice
	Koruköy, Yenice
	Kovancı, Yenice
	Kuzupınarı, Yenice
	Namazgah, Yenice
	Nevruz, Yenice
	Oğlanalanı, Yenice
	Öğmen, Yenice
	Örencik, Yenice
	Pazarköy, Yenice
	Reşadiye, Yenice
	Sameteli, Yenice
	Sarıçayır, Yenice
	Sazak, Yenice
	Seyvan, Yenice
	Sofular, Yenice
	Soğucak, Yenice
	Suuçtu, Yenice
	Taban, Yenice
	Torhasan, Yenice
	Umurlar, Yenice
	Üçkabaağaç, Yenice
	Yağdıran, Yenice
	Yalıoba, Yenice
	Yarış, Yenice
	Yeniköy, Yenice
	Yeşilköy, Yenice
	Yukarıçavuş, Yenice
	Yukarıinova, Yenice
	Yukarıkaraaşık, Yenice

References

List
Canakkale